Edward Popham (?1711-72), of Littlecote, Wiltshire, was an English politician.

He was a Member (MP) of the Parliament of Great Britain for Great Bedwyn 5 April 1738 - 1741 and for Wiltshire 1741 to 1772.

References

1711 births
1772 deaths
Members of the Parliament of Great Britain for Wiltshire
British MPs 1734–1741
British MPs 1741–1747
British MPs 1747–1754
British MPs 1754–1761
British MPs 1761–1768
British MPs 1768–1774
Members of Parliament for Great Bedwyn